(), also called moonlight cake, Hakka mooncake, and sometimes referred as Hakka mooncake biscuits or Hakka Moonlight cake in English, is a form of traditional mooncake of Hakka origins. It is a white, flat and disc-like biscuit which typically features carvings and paintings of flowers and animals on its top surface as adornments. It was traditionally used as offerings to the moon on the Mid-Autumn Festival. It is also consumed by the Hakka diaspora and/or people of Chinese and/or Hakka heritage in countries outside of China, such as countries in the regions of Southeast Asia and Africa (Mauritius).

Ingredients 
The  is mainly composed of two ingredients: glutinous rice flour and sugar. If there is any fillings inside the cake, it is usually candied winter melon, desiccated coconut, and sesame seeds which is mixed with glutinous rice flour, sugar, margarine, and water.

Outside China

Africa 
The  continues to be produced, sold, and consumed on the island of Mauritius by the Sino-Mauritians community during the Mid-Autumn Festival as a traditional custom and practice. The  has been introduced by the Hakka diaspora and their ancestors, where it is called Niat Kwong kow (Hakka Chinese: ngiad6 guong1 gau1) but is more commonly referred by its local Mauritian creole name as gato lalune although the term gato lalune is also applied to several forms of mooncakes, including the Niat piang.

See also 

 Mooncake
 Bánh in
 List of Chinese desserts

References

External links 

 Recipe of Hakka Mooncake Biscuits 
 Image of commercialized Hakka mooncake

Autumn traditions
Cakes
Chinese confectionery
Chinese pastries
Moon in culture
Stuffed desserts
Mauritian culture